Veiko-Vello Palm (born on 29 May 1971) is an Estonian Major General of the Estonian Defence Forces. Since 2021, he is the Deputy Commander of the Estonian Defence Forces.

Early life
Veiko-Vello Palm was born on 29 May 1971. He attended the Tallinn 21st School, which he graduated in 1989.

Military career

Veiko-Vello Palm started his military career with the Estonian Defence Forces in 1992 as conscript in Kalev Infantry Battalion. Between 1992 and 1994 he studied at the Estonian Academy of Security Sciences. He received his bachelor's degree in 2001 from the National Defence University of Finland, and a master's degree in 2005 from the same university. He has also attended various other courses during his career - officer course in 1996, battalion commander course (armored forces) in 2003, NATO Combat Readiness Evaluation Course in 2007, higher management and higher national defence courses in 2018.

He has served in many various positions throughout his military career. Between 1995 and 1996, he served in the North Single Infantry Company. In 1997, he served as a staff officer in the Headquarters of the Defence Forces. From 2001 to 2002, he served in the Headquarters of the Land Force. After that, until 2003, he worked as a lector in the Estonian Military Academy. Between 2005 and 2007, he served as Chief of Staff in Tapa Training Center. After serving as an International Security Assistance Force staff officer in Afghanistan between 2007 and 2008, he returned to the Headquarters of the Defence Forces. In 2009, he joined the Multinational Corps Northeast as a senior staff officer. During his time with MCN, he served a second stint in Afghanistan with ISAF. He moved on to the Estonian Ministry of Defence as chief of the Defence Planning Department in 2012. In 2015, he became the commander of the 1st Infantry Brigade. In 2018, he was appointed as the Chief of Staff of the Headquarters of the Defence Forces. He was named Deputy Commander of the Estonian Defence Forces in 2021.

Personal life
Veiko-Vello Palm is married and has two children. In addition to the Estonian language, he can speak English, Russian, and Finnish.

References

Living people
1971 births
Estonian military personnel